Toluta'u Koula may refer to:

 Toluta'u Koula (sprinter)
 Toluta'u Koula (rugby league)